Daniel de Massue, Seigneur de Rouvigny was a French nobleman born in 1577, and died in 1613. He was married to Madeleine de Pinot des Fontaines, by whom he had four children:
 Rachel de Massue, mother of Rachel Wriothesley
 Henri de Massue, 1st Marquis de Rouvigny 
 Maximilien de Massue 
 Sarah de Massue 

The Seigneur was the son of Nicholas De Massue, a French gentleman, and brought rank and fame to his family.

References 

1577 births
1603 deaths